The Blackguard (1925) is a British-German drama film directed by Graham Cutts and starring Jane Novak, Walter Rilla, and Frank Stanmore.

Plot
Against the backdrop of the Russian Revolution, a violinist (Rilla) saves a princess (Novak) from execution.

Cast

Production
The film was a co-production between Gainsborough Studios and UFA initiating a decade-long series of co-productions which ended with the rise of the Nazi Party in the 1930s. The film was based on the 1923 novel The Blackguard by Raymond Paton, and shot at Studio Babelsberg, in Potsdam near Berlin, the first time a Gainsborough film was shot abroad. The film was one of a number of films made in this genre during the 1920s, the most successful of which was the American film The Student Prince in Old Heidelberg (1927).

While working on the film, Alfred Hitchcock was able to study several films being made nearby, including The Last Laugh (1924) by F. W. Murnau, which were a major influence on his later work.

References

Bibliography

External links

 The Blackguard at the British Film Institute's Screenonline

1925 films
1925 drama films
British drama films
German drama films
Films of the Weimar Republic
British silent feature films
German silent feature films
Films directed by Graham Cutts
Films based on British novels
British black-and-white films
German black-and-white films
Films produced by Erich Pommer
Russian Revolution films
Films shot at Babelsberg Studios
UFA GmbH films
1920s British films
Silent drama films
1920s German films